Lawrenceville is an unincorporated community in Jackson Township, Dearborn County, Indiana.

History
Lawrenceville was laid out in the 1830s. It was named for its founder, Jonathan Lawrence.

A post office was established at Lawrenceville in 1846, and remained in operation until it was discontinued in 1904.

Geography

References

Unincorporated communities in Dearborn County, Indiana
Unincorporated communities in Indiana
1830s establishments in Indiana
Populated places established in the 1830s